The Vermont was the first automobile to cross the United States. It traveled from San Francisco, California to Manhattan, New York.  It was a 1903 Winton. The crew was owner Horatio Nelson Jackson, mechanic Sewall K. Crocker and their dog Bud.

The car is in the permanent collection of the Smithsonian Institution's National Museum of American History.

References

Defunct motor vehicle manufacturers of the United States